Trill most often refers to:

 Trill (music), a type of musical ornament
 Trill consonant, a type of sound used in some languages

Trill may also refer to:

Fictional entities
 Trill (Star Trek), two symbiotic races of aliens in the fictional Star Trek universe
 Trill, the main character in Captive
 Trill, an infant NetNavi from the MegaMan Anime

Music
 Trill (album), an album by rapper Bun B
 II Trill, the second solo album from Bun B
 "Trill", a song by Mami Kawada off the album Savia
 "Trill", a song by Clipse off the Hell Hath No Fury album
 Trill Entertainment, a record label

Other uses
 Trill Williams (born 1999), American football player
 TRILL (computing), Transparent Interconnection of Lots of Links
 Trill, an Australian bird food maker, and division of Mars, Incorporated

See also
 Thrill (disambiguation)
 TRIL (disambiguation)
 Triller (disambiguation)